Charaxes porthos, the Porthos untailed charaxes, is a butterfly in the family Nymphalidae. It is found in Guinea, Sierra Leone, Ivory Coast, Ghana, Nigeria, Cameroon, the Central African Republic, Gabon, the Republic of the Congo, the Democratic Republic of the Congo, Uganda and Tanzania.

Description

Ch. porthos Smith. male Hindwing above with a blue transverse band 4-5 mm. in breadth, placed in the middle and continued on the forewing almost straight to vein 6 or 7, but then becoming gradually narrower and breaking up into spots. female unknown [at that date]. Cameroons to the Congo; very rare.

Biology
The habitat consists of  lowland evergreen forests and drier forests. 

Notes on the biology of porthos are given by Congdon and Collins (1998)

Subspecies
C. p. porthos (eastern Nigeria, Cameroon, Central African Republic, Gabon, Congo, Democratic Republic of the Congo: Ubangi, Mongala, Uele, Tshopo, Kinshasa, Sankuru)
C. p. dummeri Joicey & Talbot, 1922<ref>Joicey , J.J., & Talbot, G. 1922. New forms of the genus Charaxes (Nymphalidae) from Africa and Malaya. Bulletin of the Hill Museum, Witley. 1: 335-338.</ref> (Uganda, north-western Tanzania)C. p. gallayi van Someren, 1968 (Guinea, Sierra Leone, Ivory Coast, Ghana, western Nigeria)C. p. katangae Rousseau-Decelle, 1931 (Democratic Republic of the Congo: Lualaba)

TaxonomyCharaxes porthos is a member of the species group Charaxes lycurgus. 
The supposed clade members are:

Clade 1 Charaxes lycurgus - nominateCharaxes porthos Charaxes zelicaClade 2Charaxes mycerina Charaxes doubledayiReferences

Victor Gurney Logan Van Someren, 1974 Revisional notes on African Charaxes (Lepidoptera: Nymphalidae). Part IX. Bulletin of the British Museum of Natural History (Entomology) 29 (8):415-487.  also as dunkeli''

External links
Images of C. p. dummeri Royal Museum for Central Africa (Albertine Rift Project)
Images of C. p. porthos (Albertine Rift Project)
Images of C. p. katangae (Albertine Rift Project)
Charaxes porthos images at Consortium for the Barcode of Life
C. p. porthos images at BOLD
C. p. dummeri images at BOLD
C. p. galayi images at BOLD

Butterflies described in 1883
porthos
Butterflies of Africa
Taxa named by Henley Grose-Smith